Washington University in St. Louis (WashU or WUSTL) is a private research university with its main campus in St. Louis County, and Clayton, Missouri. Founded in 1853, the university is named after George Washington.

The university's 169-acre Danforth Campus is at the center of Washington University and is the academic home to the majority of the university’s undergraduate, graduate, and professional students. The Danforth Campus features predominantly Collegiate Gothic architecture in its academic buildings and is bordered by Forest Park and the cities of St. Louis, Clayton and University City. The university also has a West Campus in Clayton, North Campus in the West End neighborhood of St. Louis, and Medical Campus in the Central West End neighborhood of St. Louis. The Washington University Medical Campus spreads over 17 city blocks and 164 acres. The center is home to the Washington University School of Medicine in St. Louis and its affiliated hospitals, clinics, patient care centers and research facilities.

It has students and faculty from all 50 U.S. states and more than 120 countries. Washington University is composed of seven graduate and undergraduate schools that encompass a broad range of academic fields. To prevent confusion over its location, the university's board of trustees added the phrase "in St. Louis" in 1976.

Washington University has been a member of the Association of American Universities since 1923 and is classified among "R1: Doctoral Universities – Very high research activity". The National Science Foundation ranked the university 28th among academic institutions in the United States for research and development (R&D) expenditures. As of 2022, 26 Nobel laureates in economics, physiology and medicine, chemistry, and physics have been affiliated with Washington University, 11 having done the major part of their pioneering research at the university.

History

Early history (1853–1900)
Washington University was conceived by 17 St. Louis business, political, and religious leaders concerned by the lack of institutions of higher learning in the Midwest. Missouri State Senator Wayman Crow and Unitarian minister William Greenleaf Eliot, grandfather of the poet T.S. Eliot, led the effort.

The university's first chancellor was Joseph Gibson Hoyt. Crow secured the university charter from the Missouri General Assembly in 1853, and Eliot was named President of the Board of Trustees. Early on, Eliot solicited support from members of the local business community, including John O'Fallon, but Eliot failed to secure a permanent endowment. Washington University is unusual among major American universities in not having had a prior financial endowment. The institution had no backing of a religious organization, single wealthy patron, or earmarked government support.

During the three years following its inception, the university bore three different names. The board first approved "Eliot Seminary", but William Eliot was uncomfortable with naming a university after himself and objected to the establishment of a seminary which would implicitly be charged with teaching a religious faith. He favored a nonsectarian university. Under pressure from Eliot, the Board of Trustees created a task force charged with naming the university, headed by Samuel Treat. Several months later Treat's committee proposed naming the University the Washington Institute, after the nation's first president George Washington.  In 1854, the board of trustees changed the name to "Washington Institute" in honor of George Washington and because the charter was coincidentally passed on Washington's birthday, February 22. Naming the university after the nation's first president, only seven years before the American Civil War and during a time of bitter national division, was no coincidence. During this time of conflict, Americans universally admired George Washington as the father of the United States and a symbol of national unity. The board believed that the university should be a force of unity in a strongly divided Missouri. In 1856, the university amended its name to "Washington University". The university amended its name once more in 1976, when the board voted to add the suffix "in St. Louis" to distinguish the university from the over two dozen other universities bearing Washington's name.

Although chartered as a university, for many years Washington University functioned primarily as a night school located on 17th Street and Washington Avenue in the heart of downtown St. Louis. Owing to limited financial resources, Washington University initially used public buildings. Classes began on October 22, 1854, at the Benton School building. At first the university paid for the evening classes, but as their popularity grew, their funding was transferred to the St. Louis Public Schools. Eventually the board secured funds for the construction of Academic Hall and a half dozen other buildings. Later the university divided into three departments: the Manual Training School, Smith Academy, and the Mary Institute.

In 1867, the university opened the first private nonsectarian law school west of the Mississippi River. By 1882, Washington University had expanded to numerous departments, which were housed in various buildings across St. Louis. Medical classes were first held at Washington University in 1891 after the St. Louis Medical College decided to affiliate with the university, establishing the School of Medicine. However, by the 1890s the university was on the brink of financial collapse until Robert Sommers Brookings, president of the Board of Trustees, undertook the task of rebuilding the university's finances and acquiring land for a new campus. Brookings was instrumental in raising money for the university, since Eliot, the primary fundraiser for the university, had died.

In 1896, Holmes Smith, professor of Drawing and History of Art, designed what would become the basis for the modern-day university seal. The seal is made up of elements from the Washington family coat of arms and the symbol of Louis IX, whom the city is named after.

Modern era (1900–1955)

Washington University spent its first half century in downtown St. Louis bounded by Washington Ave., Lucas Place, and Locust Street. By the 1890s, owing to the dramatic expansion of the medical school and a new benefactor in Robert Brookings, the university began to move west. The university board of directors began a process to find suitable ground and hired the landscape architecture firm Olmsted, Olmsted & Eliot of Boston. A committee of Robert S. Brookings, Henry Ware Eliot, and William Huse found a site of  just beyond Forest Park, located west of the city limits in St. Louis County. The elevation of the land was thought to resemble the Acropolis and inspired the nickname of "Hilltop" campus, renamed the Danforth campus in 2006 to honor former chancellor William H. Danforth.

In 1899, the university opened a national design contest for the new campus. The renowned Philadelphia firm Cope & Stewardson (same architects who designed a large part of the University of Pennsylvania and Princeton University) won unanimously with its plan for a row of Collegiate Gothic quadrangles inspired by Oxford and Cambridge Universities. The cornerstone of the first building, Busch Hall, was laid on October 20, 1900. The construction of Brookings Hall, Ridgley, and Cupples began shortly thereafter. The university delayed occupying these buildings until 1905 to accommodate the 1904 World's Fair and Olympics. The delay allowed the university to construct ten buildings instead of the seven originally planned. This original cluster of buildings set a precedent for the development of the Danforth Campus; Cope & Stewardson's original plan and its choice of building materials have, with few exceptions, guided the construction and expansion of the Danforth Campus to the present day.
By 1915, construction of a new medical complex was completed on Kings Highway in what is now St. Louis's Central West End. In 1918, Washington University admitted its first women medical students.

In 1922, a young physics professor, Arthur Holly Compton, conducted a series of experiments in the basement of Eads Hall that demonstrated the "particle" concept of electromagnetic radiation. Compton's discovery, known as the "Compton Effect," earned him the Nobel Prize in physics in 1927.

During World War II, as part of the Manhattan Project, a cyclotron at Washington University was used to produce small quantities of the newly discovered element plutonium via neutron bombardment of uranium nitrate hexahydrate. The plutonium produced there in 1942 was shipped to the Metallurgical Laboratory Compton had established at the University of Chicago where Glenn Seaborg's team used it for extraction, purification, and characterization studies of the exotic substance.

After working for 22 years at the University of Chicago, Arthur Holly Compton returned to St. Louis in 1946 to serve as Washington University's ninth chancellor. Compton reestablished the Washington University football team, making the declaration that athletics were to be henceforth played on a "strictly amateur" basis with no athletic scholarships. Under Compton's leadership, enrollment at the university grew dramatically, fueled primarily by World War II veterans' use of their GI Bill benefits.

In 1947, Gerty Cori, a professor at the School of Medicine, became the first woman to win a Nobel Prize in Physiology or Medicine. Professors Carl and Gerty Cori became Washington University's fifth and sixth Nobel laureates for their discovery of how glycogen is broken down and resynthesized in the body.

The process of desegregation at Washington University began in 1947 with the School of Medicine and the School of Social Work. During the mid and late 1940s, the university was the target of critical editorials in the local African American press, letter-writing campaigns by churches and the local Urban League, and legal briefs by the NAACP intended to strip its tax-exempt status. In spring 1949, a Washington University student group, the Student Committee for the Admission of Negroes (SCAN), began campaigning for full racial integration. In May 1952, the board of trustees passed a resolution desegregating the school's undergraduate divisions.

Recent history (1955–present)

During the latter half of the 20th century, Washington University transitioned from a strong regional university to a national research institution. In 1957, planning began for the construction of the "South 40", a complex of modern residential halls which primarily house freshmen and some sophomore students. With the additional on-campus housing, Washington University, which had been predominantly a "streetcar college" of commuter students, began to attract a more national pool of applicants. By 1964, over two-thirds of incoming students came from outside the St. Louis area.

In 1971, the board of trustees appointed Chancellor William Henry Danforth, who guided the university through the social and financial crises of the 1970s and strengthened the university's often strained relationship with the St. Louis community. During his 24-year chancellorship, Danforth significantly improved the School of Medicine, established 70 new faculty chairs, secured a $1.72 billion endowment, and tripled the amount of student scholarships.

In 1995, Mark S. Wrighton, former provost at MIT, was elected the university's 14th Chancellor. During Chancellor Wrighton's tenure undergraduate applications to Washington University more than doubled. Since 1995, the university has added more than 190 endowed professorships, revamped its Arts & Sciences curriculum, and completed more than 30 new buildings.

The growth of Washington University's reputation coincided with a series of record-breaking fund-raising efforts during the last three decades. From 1983 to 1987, the "Alliance for Washington University" campaign raised $630.5 million, which was then the most successful fund-raising effort in national history. From 1998 to 2004, the "Campaign for Washington University" raised $1.55 billion, which was applied to additional scholarships, professorships, and research initiatives.

The campus was the venue for four Presidential debates, and one Vice-Presidential debate: the first 1992 Presidential debate on October 11, 1992, the third 2000 Presidential debate on October 17, 2000, the second 2004 Presidential debate on October 8, 2004, the 2008 Vice-Presidential debate on October 2, and the second 2016 Presidential debate on October 9, 2016. The University was scheduled to host a debate in 1996, but that debate was cancelled when the number of scheduled debates was scaled back to two.

In 2002, Washington University co-founded the Cortex Innovation Community in St. Louis's Midtown neighborhood. Cortex is the largest innovation hub in the midwest, home to offices of Square, Microsoft, Aon, Boeing, and Centene. The innovation hub has generated more than 3,800 tech jobs in 14 years.

In the summer of 2002, Brookings Hall Room 300 was transformed into the Mission Control center for Steve Fossett's sixth and ultimately successful attempt to circumnavigate the planet in a balloon—the Spirit of Freedom.

In 2005, Washington University founded the McDonnell International Scholars Academy, an international network of premier research universities, with an initial endowment gift of $10 million from John F. McDonnell. The academy, which selects scholars from 35 partner universities around the world, was created with the intent to develop a cohort of future leaders, strengthen ties with top foreign universities, and promote global awareness and social responsibility.

At the start of the Fall 2006 semester, the St. Louis Metro opened the Cross–County extension of its light rail MetroLink system. Three of the nine new stations directly serve the University (Skinker, University City-Big Bend, and Forsyth). On July 1, 2006, the University began offering free Metro passes—the U Pass—to all full-time students, benefits-eligible faculty and staff, and full-time employees of qualified service providers .

In 2019, Washington University unveiled a $360 million campus transformation project known as the "East End Transformation". The transformation project, built on the original 1895 campus plan by Olmsted, Olmsted & Eliot, encompassed 18 acres of the Danforth Campus, adding five new buildings, expanding the university's Mildred Lane Kemper Art Museum, relocating hundreds of surface parking spaces underground, and creating an expansive new park.

In June 2019, Andrew D. Martin, former dean of the College of Literature, Science, and the Arts at the University of Michigan, was elected the university's 15th chancellor. On the day of his inauguration, Chancellor Martin announced the "WashU Pledge", a financial aid program allowing full-time Missouri and southern Illinois students who are Pell Grant-eligible or from families with annual incomes of $75,000 or less to attend the university cost-free.

In October 2021, Washington University announced it would invest an additional $1 billion in financial aid for students. That investment allowed Washington University to adopt a need-blind undergraduate admissions policy, effective immediately. The new financial aid initiative, called Gateway to Success, will include $800 million in endowed funding to support need-blind undergraduate admissions, meaning the university will not consider an applicant's financial situation when making admissions decisions while still meeting 100% of demonstrated financial need for admitted undergraduates. Another $200 million will be designated for financial aid for graduate and professional students in the university's Brown School, the School of Law and the School of Medicine, as well as in business, engineering, art and architecture, and Arts & Sciences.

In 2022, Washington University was one of 10 universities picked to join the Kessler Scholars National Collaborative, which provides support for selected first-generation and Pell-Grant eligible STEM students who hope to improve society. The program aims to recruit 20 fully-funded Kessler scholars per year and provide additional opportunities to close the wealth gap. Also, in 2022, Washington University developed a needle-free nasal vaccine to combat COVID-19.

U.S. presidential and vice-presidential debates

Washington University has been selected by the Commission on Presidential Debates to host more presidential and vice-presidential debates than any other institution in history. United States presidential election debates were held at the Washington University Athletic Complex in 1992, 2000, 2004, and 2016. A presidential debate was planned to occur in 1996, but owing to scheduling difficulties between the candidates, the debate was canceled. The university hosted the only 2008 vice presidential debate, between Republican Sarah Palin and Democrat Joe Biden, on October 2, 2008, also at the Washington University Athletic Complex. The university hosted the second 2016 presidential debate, between Republican Party candidate Donald Trump and Democratic Party candidate Hillary Clinton, on October 9, 2016.

Although Chancellor Wrighton had noted after the 2004 debate that it would be "improbable" that the university will host another debate and was not eager to commit to the possibility, he subsequently changed his view and the university submitted a bid for the 2008 debates. "These one-of-a-kind events are great experiences for our students, they contribute to a national understanding of important issues, and they allow us to help bring national and international attention to the St. Louis region as one of America's great metropolitan areas," said Wrighton.

The university decided not to host a 2020 presidential debate, against the majority opinion of the student body.

Geography and campuses

Danforth Campus

The main, or Danforth Campus (formerly known as the Hilltop Campus) is mostly between Forest Park Parkway, Wydown Boulevard, North Big Bend Boulevard, and North Skinker Boulevard.

Although the school includes "St. Louis" in its name, the majority of the school's main campus is located in unincorporated St. Louis County and suburban Clayton.

A large portion of the Danforth Campus is recognized as the Washington University Hilltop Campus Historic District, which achieved National Historic Landmark status on February 27, 1987.

The Barry Flanagan bronze statue, "Thinker on a Rock," widely known, simply, as "The Bunny", is currently on permanent loan to Washington University and features prominently near Olin Library, Graham Chapel and Mallinckrodt.

Danforth Campus includes:

 Arts and Sciences
 Brookings Hall
 Center for the Humanities
 Center for Mental Health Services Research
 Center for Social Development
 Crow Observatory
 Danforth University Center (DUC): Completed in 2008, it occupies the space where Prince Hall once stood and is the main student center on campus. The three-story, 116,000sqft building features dining areas, lounges, meeting rooms, and offices for student leaders and student services professional staff. Housed in the DUC is the Career Center, the Student Union student government, Student Life newspaper, WUTV, a recording studio for KWUR, the Graduate Center, and other on-campus groups.
 Francis Olympic Field
 Gephardt Institute for Civic and Community Engagement
 International Center for Energy, Environment and Sustainability 
 Mallinckrodt Center: The central student center on the Danforth Campus. It houses the Campus Book Store, Computer Store, Dining Services, the Edison Theatre, the Division of Drama, the Division of Dance, and the Department of Performing Arts. WUTV is also housed inside. 
 McKelvey School of Engineering
 Mildred Lane Kemper Art Museum
 Olin Business School
 Ridgley Hall: This served as the University's first library building until the early 1960s. During the 1904 World's Fair, Ridgley housed an exhibit of Queen Victoria's Diamond Jubilee gifts. The former library reading room was transformed into an ornate lounge space, which today is known as Holmes Lounge. Ridgley Hall is also the home of several language departments, the Committee on Comparative Literature and the Language Lab.
 Sam Fox School of Design & Visual Arts
 Skandalaris Center for Interdisciplinary Innovation and Entrepreneurship
 The Brown School
 The Center for Teaching and Learning
 Washington University School of Law
 Weidenbaum Center on the Economy, Government, and Public Policy
 Whitney R. Harris World Law Institute

In 2019, a $360 million renovation project, the "East End Transformation", was unveiled on the Danforth Campus, building on the original 1895 campus plan by Olmsted, Olmsted & Eliot. The project included the creation of the Gary M. Sumers Welcome Center, which now houses undergraduate admissions; the Craig and Nancy Schnuck Pavilion, which houses a café, the Environmental Studies program and the Office of Sustainability; the Henry A. and Elvira H. Jubel Hall, which houses the Department of Mechanical Engineering & Materials Science in the McKelvey School of Engineering; and the James M. McKelvey, Sr. Hall, which will be completed in 2020 and open in 2021 and will house the McKelvey School of Engineering's Department of Computer Science & Engineering. All new buildings on the east end have been designed to achieve LEED-Gold certification, and include solar panels located on many of the roofs to generate renewable electricity. In addition to the five new buildings, the project relocated 6 acres of parking lots underground, renovated and expanded the Mildred Lane Kemper Art Museum, and created the Ann and Andrew Tisch Park.

In 2020, the Princeton Review ranked the Danforth Campus among the top 10 "Most Beautiful Campuses" in the United States.

Medical Campus
The Medical Campus is accessible via the Central West End MetroLink station, which provides a quick link to the Danforth, North, and West Campuses. All full-time Washington University students and employees are eligible for a Metro Transit U-Pass, which grants access to use the MetroLink and Metro buses for free.
Washington University Medical Center comprises  spread over approximately 12 city blocks, located along the eastern edge of Forest Park within the Central West End neighborhood of St. Louis. The campus is home to the Washington University School of Medicine and its associated teaching hospitals, Barnes-Jewish Hospital and St. Louis Children's Hospital. Many of the buildings are connected via a series of skyways and corridors.

Olin Residence Hall, named for Spencer T. Olin, provides residential services for 200 medical and graduate students.

The School's 2,100 employed and volunteer faculty physicians also serve as the medical staff of Barnes-Jewish and St. Louis Children's hospitals, which are part of BJC HealthCare. Washington University and BJC have taken on many joint venture projects, such as the Center for Advanced Medicine, completed in December 2001.

In 2019, Washington University was awarded a $7.6 million grant from the National Cancer Institute to create the Implementation Science Center for Cancer Control to address disparities in cancer care in parts of Missouri and Illinois. In 2022, Washington University's Institute of Clinical and Translational Sciences was awarded a five-year $61 million grant from the National Center for Advancing Translational Sciences of the National Institutes of Health, to focus on precision medicine, health equity, and diversity.

In 2020, Washington University announced the construction of a new $616 million, 11 story, 609,000-square-foot neuroscience research building which will sit at the eastern edge of the Medical Campus in the Cortex Innovation Community. Construction of the building is set to be finished in 2023.

The Medical Campus includes:
Alvin J. Siteman Cancer Center
Barnes-Jewish Hospital
Center for Advanced Medicine
Center for Cancer Genomics
Center for Women's Infectious Disease Research 
Central Institute for the Deaf
Charles F. and Joanne Knight Alzheimer Disease Research Center
Mallinckrodt Institute of Radiology
McDonnell Genome Institute
St. Louis Children's Hospital

North and West Campuses
Washington University's North Campus and West Campus principally house administrative functions that are not student focused. North Campus lies in St. Louis City near the Delmar Loop. The university acquired the building and adjacent property in 2004, formerly home to the Angelica Uniform Factory. Several university administrative departments are located at the North Campus location, including offices for Quadrangle Housing, Accounting and Treasury Services, Parking and Transportation Services, Army ROTC, and Network Technology Services. The North Campus location also provides off-site storage space for the Performing arts Department. Renovations are still ongoing; recent additions to the North Campus space include a small eatery operated by Bon Appétit Management Company, the university's on-campus food provider, completed during spring semester 2007, as well as the Family Learning Center, operated by Bright Horizons and opened in September 2010.

The West Campus building was home to the Clayton branch of the Famous-Barr department store until 1990, when the university acquired the property and adjacent parking and began a series of renovations. Today, the basement level houses the West Campus Library, the University Archives, the Modern Graphic History Library, and conference space. The ground level still remains a retail space. The upper floors house consolidated capital gifts, portions of university advancement, and information systems offices from across the Danforth and Medical School campuses. There is also a music rehearsal room on the second floor.

Both the North and West Campuses are accessible by the St. Louis MetroLink, which, with the Delmar Loop and Forsyth MetroLink Stations directly adjacent to these campuses, provides easy travel around the St. Louis metropolitan area, including all of Washington University's campuses.

Tyson Research Center

Tyson Research Center is a  field station located west of St. Louis on the Meramec River. Washington University obtained Tyson as surplus property from the federal government in 1963. It is used by the university as a biological field station and research/education center. In 2010, the Living Learning Center was named one of the first two buildings accredited nationwide as a "living building" under the Living Building Challenge, opened to serve as a biological research station and classroom for summer students.

Academics

Arts and Sciences

Arts & Sciences is home to the College of Arts & Sciences as well as graduate programs across its many departments. Feng Sheng Hu is the Dean of the Faculty of Arts & Sciences.

 The College of Arts & Sciences is the central undergraduate unit of the university with 330 tenured and tenure-track faculty along with over 100 research scientists, lecturers, artists in residence, and visitors serving more than 3,700 undergraduates in 40 academic departments divided into divisions of Humanities, Social sciences, and Natural sciences and Mathematics. The College of Arts & Sciences has an average class size of 18 students, with over 80% having fewer than 24. Almost one-half of the undergraduate classes have fewer than 10 students. The student-faculty ratio is 7:1.
 The College of Arts & Sciences offers courses in over a dozen languages, including Arabic, Hebrew, Spanish, German, French, Swahili, Chinese, Japanese, Korean, Russian, Greek, Italian, Hindi, Portuguese, and Latin. University College in Arts & Sciences also offers course work in Swedish, Vietnamese, Irish, and Czech.

Business
Founded as the School of Commerce and Finance in 1917, the Olin Business School was named after entrepreneur John M. Olin in 1988. The school's academic programs include BSBA, MBA, Professional MBA (PMBA), Executive MBA (EMBA), MS in finance, MS in supply chain management, MS in customer analytics, Master of Accounting, Global Master of Finance Dual Degree program, and Doctorate programs, as well as non-degree Executive Education. In 2002, an Executive MBA program was established in Shanghai, in cooperation with Fudan University.

Olin has a network of more than 16,000 alumni worldwide. Over the last several years, the school's endowment has increased to $213 million (2004) and annual gifts average $12 million per year. Simon Hall was opened in 1986 after a donation from John E. Simon. On May 2, 2014, the $90 million conjoined Knight and Bauer Halls were dedicated, following a $15 million gift from Charles F. Knight and Joanne Knight and a $10 million gift from George and Carol Bauer through the Bauer Foundation. The two buildings are joined by a three-story-high atrium and include spaces for lectures, faculty offices, and classrooms. The café at Bauer Hall includes the only on-campus Starbucks.

In October 2019, Olin Business School ranked #1 on Inc.com's Best Business Schools for Entrepreneurship. In January 2020, Olin was named the Poets&Quants MBA Program of 2019.

Undergraduate BSBA students take 40–60% of their courses within the business school and are able to formally declare majors in eight areas: accounting, entrepreneurship, finance, healthcare management, marketing, managerial economics and strategy, organization and human resources, International Business, and operations and supply chain management. Graduate students are able to pursue an MBA either full-time or part-time. Students may also take elective courses from other disciplines at Washington University, including law and many other fields. Mark P. Taylor is the Dean of the Olin Business School.

School of Design and Visual Arts

The Sam Fox School of Design & Visual Arts was founded in 2006, merging the existing academic units of Architecture and Art with the University’s museum.  The School comprises: 
College of Architecture
Graduate School of Architecture & Urban Design
College of Art
Graduate School of Art
Mildred Lane Kemper Art Museum, considered one of the most distinguished university art collections in the country
Architecture offers BS and BA degrees at the undergraduate level, as well as the Master of Architecture, Master of Landscape Architecture, Master of Urban Design, MS in Advanced Architectural Design, and MS in Architectural Studies. There are also joint degree programs at the graduate level in conjunction with other divisions of the university. Art offers BFA and BA degrees at the undergraduate level, as well as the MFA in Visual Art and MFA in Illustration & Visual Culture.

Art offers BFA and BA degrees at the undergraduate level, as well as the MFA in Visual Art and MFA in Illustration & Visual Culture.

In October 2006 the Mildred Lane Kemper Art Museum moved into new facilities designed by Pritzker Prize-winning architect, and former faculty member, Fumihiko Maki. The art museum was first established in 1881 and was the first art museum west of the Mississippi River. It houses most of the University's art and sculpture collections, including pieces by Jackson Pollock, Robert Rauschenberg, Jenny Holzer, Pablo Picasso, Max Ernst, Willem de Kooning, Henri Matisse, Joan Miró, and Rembrandt van Rijn, among others.

Carmon Colangelo is the Ralph J. Nagel Dean of the Sam Fox School of Design & Visual Arts. Heather Woofter is director of the College of Architecture and the Graduate School of Architecture & Urban Design. Amy Hauft is the director of the College of Art and Graduate School of Art.

McKelvey School of Engineering

The McKelvey School of Engineering at Washington University in St. Louis (WashU Engineering) is a school with 88 tenured and tenure-track professors, 40 additional full-time faculty, 1,300 undergraduate students, 560 master's students, 380 PhD students, and more than 20,000 alumni. Aaron Bobick serves as dean of the school.

With approximately $27million in annual research awards, the school focuses intellectual efforts on medicine and health, energy and environment, entrepreneurship, and security. The school is ranked among the top 50 by the magazine U.S. News & World Report, and the biomedical engineering graduate program was ranked 12th by U.S. News & World Report in 2012–2013.

On January 31, 2019, the School of Engineering & Applied Science was renamed the James McKelvey School of Engineering, in honor of trustee and distinguished alumnus Jim McKelvey Jr., the co-founder of Square, after his donation of an undisclosed sum that the school's dean, Aaron Bobick, said has been the largest in the school's 162-year history.

Departments include:
Biomedical Engineering 
Computer Science & Engineering 
Electrical & Systems Engineering 
Energy, Environmental & Chemical Engineering 
Mechanical Engineering & Materials Science

School of Law
Washington University School of Law offers joint-degree programs with the Olin Business School, the Graduate School of Arts and Sciences, the School of Medicine, and the School of Social Work. It also offers an LLM in Intellectual Property and Technology Law, an LLM in Taxation, an LLM in US Law for Foreign Lawyers, a Master of Juridical Studies (MJS), and a Juris Doctoris (JD). The law school offers 3 semesters of courses in the Spring, Summer, and Fall, and requires at least 85 credit hours of coursework for the JD.

In the 2022 and 2021 U.S. News & World Report rankings, the law school ranked 16th nationally. The law school offers a full-time day program, beginning in August, for the J.D. degree. The law school is located in Anheuser-Busch Hall (opened in 1997).

Russell Osgood is the Dean of the School of Law.

Medicine
The Washington University School of Medicine was founded in 1891. In the 2021 U.S. News & World Report rankings of U.S. medical schools, it was ranked sixth for research and tied for 31st for primary care. The McDonnell Genome Institute (directed by Richard K. Wilson) is housed within the Washington University School of Medicine; it is one of three NIH-funded major DNA sequencing centers in the U.S. and played a significant role in the Human Genome Project. In 2022, the Washington University School of Medicine was the third medical school in the United States that received the most NIH funding.
The medical school partners with St. Louis Children's Hospital and Barnes-Jewish Hospital (part of BJC HealthCare), where all physicians are members of the school's faculty.

Social Work and Public Health

With roots dating back to 1909 in the university's School of Social Economy, the George Warren Brown School of Social Work (commonly called GWB, the Brown School, or Brown) was founded in 1925. Brown's academic degree offerings include a Master of Social Work (MSW), a Master of Public Health (MPH), a PhD in Social Work, and a PhD in Public Health Sciences. It is currently ranked first among Master of Social Work programs in the United States. The school was endowed by Bettie Bofinger Brown and named for her husband, George Warren Brown, a St. Louis philanthropist and co-founder of the Brown Shoe Company. The school was the first in the country to have a building for the purpose of social work education, and it is also a founding member of the Association of Schools and Programs of Public Health.

McDonnell International Scholars Academy
The McDonnell International Scholars Academy (MISA) is an alliance between universities that supports collaboration on research, development of joint educational opportunities, and joint research conferences.   The program is named after John F. McDonnell, who provided an initial $10 million gift to establish the academy in 2005.  MISA features a graduate-level endowed scholarship program for international students to study at Washington University.  Founded in 2005, the academy's core mission is to develop a community of future global leaders from partner institutions worldwide.  The program is believed to be the first of its kind in the United States.

Former dental school

Founded as the Missouri Dental College in 1866, the Washington University School of Dental Medicine was the first dental school west of the Mississippi River and the sixth dental school in the United States. The first dean of the school was Homer Judd. The school closed in 1991.

Rankings and reputation

Washington University's undergraduate program is ranked 14th in the nation in the 2022 U.S. News & World Report National Universities ranking, and 11th by The Wall Street Journal in their 2018 rankings. The university is ranked 22nd in the world for 2019 by the Academic Ranking of World Universities. Undergraduate admission to Washington University is characterized by the Carnegie Foundation and U.S. News & World Report as "most selective". The Princeton Review, in its 2020 edition, gave the university an admissions selectivity rating of 99 out of 99. The acceptance rate for the class of 2026 (those entering in the fall of 2022) was 10.0%, with students selected from more than 36,000 applications. Of students admitted, 94 percent were in the top 10 percent of their class.

The Princeton Review ranked Washington University first for Best College Dorms and third for Best College Food, Best-Run Colleges, and Best Financial Aid in its 2020 edition. In its 2022 edition, Princeton Review also ranked Washington University as number 2 for "Top Entrepreneurship Under Ten Thousand Students", #1 for "Top Midwest Entreprenuerships", as a "Colleges That Create Futures" and of having a great quality of life. Niche listed the university as the best college for architecture and the second-best college campus and college dorms in the United States in 2020. The Washington University School of Medicine was ranked sixth for research by U.S. News & World Report in 2020 and has been listed among the top ten medical schools since the rankings were first published in 1987. Additionally, U.S. News & World Report ranked the university's genetics and physical therapy as tied for first place. QS World University Rankings ranked Washington University sixth in the world for anatomy and physiology in 2020.  In January 2020, Olin Business School was named the Poets&Quants MBA Program of 2019. Washington University has also been recognized as the 12th best university employer in the country by Forbes.

Washington University was named one of the "25 New Ivies" by Newsweek in 2006 and has also been called a "Hidden Ivy".

A 2014 study ranked Washington University #1 in the country for income inequality About 22% of Washington University's students came from the top 1%, while only about 6% came from the bottom 60%. In response to this, in 2015, university administration announced plans to increase the number of Pell-eligible recipients on campus from 6% to 13% by 2020, and in 2019 15% of the university's student body was eligible for Pell Grants. In October 2019, then newly inaugurated Chancellor Andrew D. Martin announced the "WashU Pledge", a financial aid program that provides a free undergraduate education to all full-time Missouri and Southern Illinois students who are Pell Grant-eligible or from families with annual incomes of $75,000 or less.

The American Talent Initiative found Washington University had the highest Pell growth rate among 130 major universities between the 2015–16 and 2019-20 academic years.

Research, research centers, and institutes

Virtually all faculty members at Washington University engage in academic research, offering opportunities for both undergraduate and graduate students across the university's seven schools. Known for its interdisciplinarity and departmental collaboration, many of Washington University's research centers and institutes are collaborative efforts between many areas on campus. More than 60% of undergraduates are involved in faculty research across all areas; it is an institutional priority for undergraduates to be allowed to participate in advanced research. According to the Center for Measuring University Performance, it is considered to be one of the top 10 private research universities in the nation. A dedicated Office of Undergraduate Research is located on the Danforth Campus and serves as a resource to post research opportunities, advise students in finding appropriate positions matching their interests, publish undergraduate research journals, and award research grants to make it financially possible to perform research.

According to the National Science Foundation, Washington University spent $920 million on research and development in 2020, ranking it 28th in the nation. The university has over 150 National Institutes of Health funded inventions, with many of them licensed to private companies. Governmental agencies and non-profit foundations such as the NIH, United States Department of Defense, National Science Foundation, and NASA provide the majority of research grant funding, with Washington University being one of the top recipients in NIH grants from year-to-year. Nearly 80% of NIH grants to institutions in the state of Missouri went to Washington University alone in 2007. Washington University and its Medical School play a large part in the Human Genome Project, where it contributes approximately 25% of the finished sequence. The Genome Sequencing Center has decoded the genome of many animals, plants, and cellular organisms, including the platypus, chimpanzee, cat, and corn.

NASA hosts its Planetary Data System Geosciences Node on the campus of Washington University. Professors, students, and researchers have been heavily involved with many unmanned missions to Mars. Professor Raymond Arvidson has been deputy principal investigator of the Mars Exploration Rover mission and co-investigator of the Phoenix lander robotic arm.

Washington University professor Joseph Lowenstein, with the assistance of several undergraduate students, has been involved in editing, annotating, making a digital archive of the first publication of poet Edmund Spenser's collective works in 100 years. A large grant from the National Endowment for the Humanities was given to support this project centralized at Washington University with support from other colleges in the United States.

In 2019, Folding@Home, a distributed computing project for performing molecular dynamics simulations of protein dynamics, was moved to Washington University School of Medicine from Stanford University. The project, currently led by Greg Bowman, uses the idle CPU time of personal computers owned by volunteers to conduct protein folding research. Folding@home's research is primarily focused on biomedical problems such as Alzheimer's disease, Cancer, Coronavirus disease 2019, and Ebola virus disease. In April 2020, Folding@home became the world's first exaFLOP computing system with a peak performance of 1.5 exaflops, making it more than seven times faster than the world's fastest supercomputer, Summit, and more powerful than the top 100 supercomputers in the world, combined.

Museums and library system

With 12 libraries, the Washington University library system is the largest in the state of Missouri, containing over 4.2 million volumes. The main library, Olin Library, is centrally located on the Danforth Campus. In 2020, the Princeton Review ranked the Olin Library among the top 10 "Best College Libraries" in the United States. Other libraries in the system include:

Kranzberg Art & Architecture Library
Business Library
Chemistry Library
East Asian Library
Law Library
Kenneth and Nancy Bernard Becker Medical Library
Music Library
Physics Library
Social Work Library
Special Collections & Archives
West Campus Library

The Mildred Lane Kemper Art Museum, established in 1881, is one of the oldest teaching museums in the country. The collection includes works from 19th-, 20th-, and 21st-century American and European artists, including George Caleb Bingham, Thomas Cole, Pablo Picasso, Max Ernst, Alexander Calder, Jackson Pollock, Rembrandt, Robert Rauschenberg, Barbara Kruger, and Christian Boltanski. Also in the complex is the  Newman Money Museum exhibiting the collection of American numismatist Eric P. Newman. In October 2006, the Kemper Art Museum moved from its previous location, Steinberg Hall, into a new facility designed by former faculty member Fumihiko Maki. The new Kemper Art Museum is located directly across from Steinberg Hall, which was Maki's first commission in 1959.

Campus life

Student organizations

Washington University has over 300 undergraduate student organizations on campus. Most are funded by the Washington University Student Union, which, as of fiscal year 2020, has an annual budget of $3.6 million that is completely student-controlled and is one of the largest student government budgets in the country. Known as SU for short, the Student Union sponsors large-scale campus programs including WILD (a semesterly concert in the quad) and free copies of the New York Times, USA Today, and the St. Louis Post-Dispatch through The Collegiate Readership Program; it also funds the campus television station, WUTV, and the radio station, KWUR. KWUR was named best radio station in St. Louis of 2003 by the Riverfront Times despite the fact its signal reaches only a few blocks beyond the boundaries of the campus. There are 11 fraternities and 9 sororities, with approximately 14% of the student body being involved in Greek life. The Congress of the South 40 (CS40) is a Residential Life and Events Programming Board, which operates outside of the SU sphere. CS40's funding comes from the housing activities fee of each student living in the South 40.

Many of these organizations and other campus life amenities are housed in the $43 million Danforth University Center on the Danforth Campus, also dedicated in honor of the Danforth family. The building opened on August 11, 2008, and earned LEED Gold certification for its environmentally friendly design.

Washington University has a large number of student-run musical groups on campus, including 13 official a cappella groups. The Pikers, an all-male group, is the oldest such group on campus. The Greenleafs, an all-female group is the oldest (and only) female group on campus. The Mosaic Whispers, founded in 1991, is the oldest co-ed group on campus. They have produced 9 albums and have appeared on a number of compilation albums, including Ben Folds' Ben Folds Presents: University A Cappella! The Amateurs, who also appeared on this album, is another co-ed a cappella group on campus, founded in 1991. They have recorded seven albums and toured extensively. After Dark is a co-ed a cappella group founded in 2001. It has released three albums and has won several Contemporary A Capella Recording (CARA) awards. In 2008 the group performed on MSNBC during coverage of the vice presidential debate with specially written songs about Joe Biden and Sarah Palin. The Ghost Lights, founded in 2010, is the campus's newest and only Broadway, Movies, and Television soundtrack group. They have performed multiple philanthropic concerts in the greater St. Louis area and were honored in November 2010 with the opportunity to perform for Nobel Laureate Douglass North at his birthday celebration. More Fools than Wise is a chamber jazz group, and The Aristocats feature Disney songs.

The campus newspaper is Student Life. The paper is published twice a week under the auspices of Washington University Student Media, Inc., an independent not-for-profit organization incorporated in 1999. The paper was first founded in 1878, making it one of the oldest student newspapers in the country.

Washington University also boasts a successful bridge team, and in fact has the largest bridge club of all colleges in the country. The university currently ranks second nationally in collegiate bridge after reaching the finals of the Collegiate Bridge Bowl at the 2022 North American Bridge Championships.

Greek life

Washington University has eleven fraternities and nine sororities on campus. In 2012, the chapter of Sigma Alpha Mu was closed following violations of drug and alcohol policies among students. In 2020, a large number of Greek life members, primarily from sororities permanently deactivated from their chapters as a result of perceived systematic oppression, racism, and sexism. Some students called for the total abolition of Greek Life on campus. As of Spring 2021, approximately 14% of the student body participated in Greek Life.

Washington University Interfraternity Council

Alpha Delta Phi
Alpha Epsilon Pi
Beta Theta Pi
Delta Chi
Kappa Sigma
Sigma Alpha Epsilon
Sigma Chi
Sigma Nu
Sigma Phi Epsilon
Tau Kappa Epsilon
Theta Xi
Zeta Beta Tau

Washington University Panhellenic Council

Alpha Epsilon Phi
Alpha Omicron Pi
Alpha Phi
Chi Omega
Delta Gamma
Gamma Phi Beta
Kappa Delta
Kappa Kappa Gamma

Residences

Washington University is number one on the Princeton Review's "Best College Dorms" list for 2020.

Over 50% of undergraduate students live on campus. It is the location of all freshman buildings as well as several sophomore buildings, which are set up in the traditional residential college system. All of the residential halls are co-ed. The dormitories on the South 40 have grown national recognition for their large size and large number of amenities. The South 40 is organized as a pedestrian-friendly environment wherein residences surround a central recreational lawn known as the Swamp. Bear's Den (the largest dining hall on campus), the Habif Health and Wellness Center (Student Health Services), the Residential Life Office, University police Headquarters, various student-owned businesses, and the baseball, softball, and intramural fields are also located on the South 40.

Another group of residences, known as the Village, is located in the northwest corner of Danforth Campus. Only open to upperclassmen and January Scholars, the North Side consists of Millbrook Apartments, The Village, Village East on-campus apartments, and all fraternity houses except the Zeta Beta Tau house, which is off campus and located just northwest of the South 40. Sororities at Washington University do not have houses by their own accord. The Village is a group of residences where students who have similar interests or academic goals apply as small groups of 4 to 24, known as BLOCs, to live together in clustered suites along with non-BLOCs. Like the South 40, the residences around the Village also surround a recreational lawn.

In addition to South 40 and North Side residence halls, Washington University owns several apartment buildings within walking distance to Danforth Campus, which are open to upperclassmen.

Student media
Washington University supports four major student-run media outlets. The university's student newspaper, Student Life, is available for students. KWUR (90.3 FM) serves as the students' official radio station; the station also attracts an audience in the immediately surrounding community due to its eclectic and free-form musical programming. WUTV is the university's closed-circuit television channel. The university's main student-run political publication is the Washington University Political Review (nicknamed "WUPR"), a self-described "multipartisan" monthly magazine. Washington University undergraduates publish two literary and art journals, The Eliot Review and Spires Intercollegiate Arts and Literary Magazine. A variety of other publications also serve the university community, ranging from in-house academic journals to glossy alumni magazines to WUnderground, the student-run satirical newspaper.

Athletics

Washington University's sports teams are called the Bears. They are members of the National Collegiate Athletic Association and participate in the University Athletic Association at the Division III level. The Bears have won 23 NCAA Division III Championships— two in women's cross country (2011, 2018), one in women's indoor track and field (2017), one in women's outdoor track and field (2017), one in men's tennis (2008), two in men's basketball (2008, 2009), five in women's basketball (1998–2001, 2010),  ten in women's volleyball (1989, 1991–1996, 2003, 2007, 2009), and one in women's soccer (2016) – and 217 UAA titles in 16 different sports. The Athletic Department was headed by John Schael for 36 years, who served as director of athletics in the period 1978–2014. The 2000 Division III Central Region winner of the National Association of Collegiate Directors of Athletics/Continental Airlines Athletics Director of the Year award, Schael helped orchestrate the Bears athletics transformation into one of the top departments in Division III. Schael was succeeded by Josh Whitman, 2014–2016. The department is now led by Anthony J. Azama.

Washington University also has an extensive club sports program, with teams ranging from men's volleyball to women's Ultimate Frisbee. The Washington University men's club water polo team has been particularly successful, capturing the Collegiate Water Polo Association Division III Club National Championship title in 2011, 2014, 2015, 2016, 2017, 2018, and 2019. Funding for club sports comes from the Student Union budget, as each club is deemed a campus group.

Washington University is home of Francis Field, site of the 1904 Summer Olympics. Francis Field is also home of the Washington University football, soccer, and track and field teams.

Traditions

 WILD – Walk In, Lay Down, the semesterly concert in the Quad which brings in popular musical acts.
 Thurtene Carnival – The oldest and largest student-run carnival in the nation, run by Thurtene Honorary.
 Vertigo – A dance party put on by the Engineering School Council (EnCouncil), featuring an innovative  computer-controlled modular LED illuminated dance floor built by students. 
 Cultural shows – Each year Washington University student groups put on several multicultural shows. Ashoka, the South Asian student association, puts on a performance for Diwali, the Indian festival of lights, that includes a skit and dances. Black Anthology is a student-run performance arts show celebrating black culture. Lunar New Year Festival is a collaboration between the many East and Southeast Asian organizations on campus culminating in a show to celebrate the Asian and Asian American experience with a skit and performances from Vietnamese, Chinese, Japanese, and Korean cultures among others. Africa Week and the African Film Festival are annual events hosted by the African Students Association. Finally, the Association of Latin American Students showcases various forms of Latin and Spanish dances during their performance, Carnaval.
Brookings Hall – A superstition among students to never step on the university seal at Brookings Hall. It is said that doing so will prevent one from graduating on time.
Convocation – A large gathering for new students and their families intended to welcome them to the university. Among others, it includes speeches from seniors and university leadership.
DUC N’ Donuts – Taking place on the first Friday of every month at the Danforth University Center (DUC), this tradition allows students to learn about monthly events while enjoying free coffee and donuts.
Art Prom – Every Spring, students from the Sam Fox School of Design and Visual Arts host a “formal” dance with a creative twist.
Underpass Panels – A series of panels along the walls of the underpass connecting the South 40 to the main Danforth Campus. Tradition involves the painting of each panel by students and clubs to advertise upcoming events. Located adjacent to the underpass is a large concrete ball, also painted to advertise student events.

Notable people

Washington University counts more than 156,000 living alumni, 29 Rhodes Scholars, and 26 Nobel laureates affiliated with the university as faculty or students.

Alumni 
Notable recent graduates of the college include: co-founder and director of Block, Inc. Jim McKelvey; chairman of Manchester United Avram Glazer, CEO of Lionsgate Films Jon Feltheimer; former deputy director of the FBI; Andrew McCabe; founder of Men's Wearhouse George Zimmer; former executive director of Greenpeace Phil Radford; founder of Gilead Sciences Michael L. Riordan; Deputy Prime Minister of Serbia Siniša Mali; Broadway Playwright and lyricist Steven Sater; Missouri Senator Jim Talent; former director of the FBI and former director of Central Intelligence William H. Webster; Nevada Senator Chic Hecht; Nebraska Congressman Hal Daub; Pulitzer Prize-winning journalists Ken Cooper and Hank Klibanoff; former President of Planned Parenthood Leana Wen;actor and filmmaker Daniel Hirsh; actor and director Harold Ramis (Ghostbusters, Caddyshack, Animal House, National Lampoon's Vacation (film series)); Tony Award winning theatrical producer David Merrick; baseball player Dal Maxvill; first director of the World Health Organization's Global Program on AIDS Jonathan Mann; science-show host Deanne Bell (Design Squad); NASA astronaut Bob Behnken; the first Black woman from Michigan to serve on the United States Court of Appeals for the Sixth Circuit, Stephanie Dawkins Davis;, Stephanie Dawkins Davis; New York Times best-selling author Susannah Cahalan; sociologist Pepper Schwartz; CDC director Rochelle Walensky; television actor Johnny Kastl;  SiriusXM Urban View radio talk-show host Joe Madison; 41st Attorney General of Missouri Chris Koster;U.S. Deputy Secretary of Health and Human Services Andrea Palm; and Paralympic Gold Medalist Kendall Gretsch.
Earlier undergraduate alumni include J. C. R. Licklider, pioneer in artificial intelligence; Charles Nagel, founder of the U.S. Chamber of Commerce; Julian W. Hill, co-inventor of nylon; Clyde Cowan, co-discoverer of the neutrino; James R. Thompson, Governor of Illinois; United States Secretary of the Interior and Governor of Missouri David R. Francis, U.S. Ambassador to Belgium Sam Fox; Edward Singleton Holden, president of the University of California; Thomas Lamb Eliot, founder of Reed College; and Abram L. Sachar, founding president of Brandeis University. Graduates of the College of Architecture include George Hellmuth, Gyo Obata, and George Kassabaum, founders of HOK, the world's fourth-largest architectural firm.
Graduate School alumni include Nobel laureates Earl Sutherland, Edwin Krebs, and Daniel Nathans who all graduated from the School of Medicine. Businessman and adventurer Steve Fossett earned his MBA from the business school. Law school graduate, Joseph Poindexter was governor of Hawaii during the Pearl Harbor attack. Doctoral alumni include the former presidents of Johns Hopkins, Clemson, Wake Forest, Morehouse, Mount Union, Yonsei, and Hong Kong University of Science and Technology. An alumnus of the Graduate School of Architecture, C. P. Wang (March 1973), designed Taipei 101, the world's second-tallest building. Mike Simpson, the U.S. representative for Idaho's 2nd congressional district is a graduate of the Dental School.
Notable students who dropped out: Charles Eames (who was expelled for defending modernist architecture); actor Peter Sarsgaard (Boys Don't Cry, An Education, Flight Plan);Tennessee Williams (who left in protest at not winning a playwriting prize); Enterprise Rent-a-Car founder Jack C. Taylor (who withdrew to fight in World War II); actor Robert Guillaume (who withdrew to study opera); Pulitzer Prize winner and bestselling author Bill Dedman (who left to become a newspaper reporter); and IQ-record holder Marilyn vos Savant (to help with a family investment business).

Faculty 
Notable faculty include economist and Nobel Memorial Prize winner Douglass North;  husband and wife biochemists and co-Nobel Prize winners Carl and Gerty Cori; 56th governor of Missouri Eric Greitens; cofounder and first executive director of the ACLU Roger Nash Baldwin, physicist and Nobel Prize winner Arthur Holly Compton; novelists Stanley Elkin and William Gass; Head of the Carnegie Foundation for the Advancement of Teaching and 5th President of MIT, Henry Smith Pritchett; leading ecologist Barry Commoner; poets Carl Phillips and Mary Jo Bang; architects Fumihiko Maki and Louis C. Spering; American legal scholar Bruce H. Mann, neurologist and Nobel Prize winner Rita Levi-Montalcini; United States Senator from Missouri Thomas Eagleton, notable artist Max Beckmann; sex researchers William Masters and Virginia Johnson; Poets Laureate Howard Nemerov and Mona Van Duyn; sociologist and "outlaw Marxist" Alvin Ward Gouldner; attorney, former Counsel to Vice-president Al Gore and former Tennessee Attorney General Charles Burson; writer and culture critic Gerald Early; founder of the American Association of University Arthur Oncken Lovejoy; video game designer Ian Bogost; economist, and former Chair of President Ronald Reagan's Council of Economic Advisors, Murray Weidenbaum; chairman and CEO of Merck & Co. Roy Vagelos, chemist Joseph W. Kennedy, co-discoverer of the element plutonium; sociologist Adia Harvey Wingfield; former vice president of the National Academy of Sciences, Barbara Schaal, first woman Director of both the National Gallery of Canada and the Philadelphia Museum of Art, Jean Sutherland Boggs; Associate Justice of the Supreme Court of the United States Wiley Rutledge, chemist Holden Thorp, editor-in-chief of Science Magazine, and Law Professor Peter Mutharika, former president of Malawi.

References

External links

Washington University Athletics website

 
Educational institutions established in 1853
1853 establishments in Missouri
Gothic Revival architecture in Missouri
Collegiate Gothic architecture in Missouri
Leadership in Energy and Environmental Design gold certified buildings
Private universities and colleges in Missouri
Universities and colleges in St. Louis
Universities and colleges in St. Louis County, Missouri
Glassmaking schools
Universities and colleges accredited by the Higher Learning Commission